A-Channel (proposed as The Alberta Channel) was a Canadian television system initially owned by Craig Media from September 1997 to 2004, then by CHUM Limited from 2004 to 2005 through A-Channel, Inc. It consisted of Craig's television stations in Winnipeg, Calgary and Edmonton, and was the company's unsuccessful attempt to build a national network.

CHUM Limited, which acquired Craig Media's television broadcasting assets in 2004 (resulting in Craig's re-incorporation to Craig Wireless), merged these stations into CHUM's flagship television network Citytv on August 2, 2005. On the same date, the A-Channel name was transferred to the NewNet stations in Southern Ontario and Vancouver Island, which are currently operated by Bell Media under the CTV 2 banner. The three original Craig Media A-Channel (now Citytv) stations are now owned by Rogers Sports & Media.

History

Under the "A-Channel" branding, Craig Media sought to develop a national presence; the network was originally proposed under "The Alberta Channel" branding before being launched under the shortened name.

Originally, Craig owned only two stations in Manitoba: CKX-TV, a CBC Television affiliate in Brandon; and CHMI-TV, an independent station (branded as the Manitoba Television Network, or MTN) in Portage la Prairie and serving Winnipeg. Looking to expand, Craig decided to counter CanWest Global's attempts to obtain licenses from the Canadian Radio-television and Telecommunications Commission (CRTC) for television stations in Alberta, with a proposal it dubbed "The Alberta Channel". During the first round of hearings in the early 1990s, neither company obtained a license. However, after a second round in the mid-1990s, Craig won against CanWest. (CanWest later bought out Western International Communications and assumed control of its Alberta-based stations.)

Craig launched A-Channel (the shortened branding Craig ended up at for its television system) stations in Edmonton (CKEM-TV) and Calgary (CKAL-TV) in 1997. They billed themselves as very locally oriented stations whose programming decisions were made in Alberta and not Toronto. Their slogan was "Very Independent, Very (city name)!"—a slogan originally used at MTN.  Programming included the local morning show The Big Breakfast, CityLine and Prime Ticket Movies, a brand initially used at MTN. MTN joined the A-Channel system in 1999.

Craig established the A-Channel Production Fund which provided financing for made-in-Alberta television movies which A-Channel would air. The most notable of these was an adaptation of A Christmas Carol starring Jack Palance.

In late 1997, Craig tried to expand A-Channel to other markets, either by acquisition or by pursuing new licenses. When Canwest purchased WIC, Craig attempted to force the company to resell WIC's Hamilton station CHCH-TV (as Canwest already owned CIII in the Toronto/Hamilton market). It also pursued stations up for grabs in Montreal (CFCF-TV) and Vancouver (CKVU-TV), and applied for a new licence in Victoria. All these attempts failed: Canwest was allowed to keep CHCH; Craig was outbid by other buyers for CFCF and CKVU; and CHUM won the Victoria licence (CIVI-TV). However, in 2001, the company's persistence seemed to pay off: The CRTC granted Craig a licence for a station in Toronto, CKXT-TV (known as Toronto 1), which was not officially part of the A-Channel system, but aired a similar program lineup and also adopted a similar logo. CKXT went on air on September 19, 2003.

A-Channel Edmonton's employees went on strike on September 17, 2003 during negotiations for a first contract. The labour dispute was resolved on February 14, 2004.

On April 12, 2004, CHUM Limited announced a deal to purchase Craig Media for $265 million. The sale was approved by the Canadian Radio-television and Telecommunications Commission on November 19, 2004, and was completed on December 1. CHUM had to sell off Toronto 1, because it already owned stations in Toronto (CITY) and nearby Barrie (CKVR). Toronto 1 was sold to Quebecor Media, owners of the media units TVA and Sun Media.

In February 2005, CHUM announced it would align Craig's A-Channel stations with its existing major-market stations under the Citytv name. No other significant changes were made, since the A-Channel stations' on-air look had always been very similar to that of Citytv.  The change took effect on August 2 of the same year, when the A-Channel name was transferred to CHUM's NewNet stations.

With the subsequent takeover of CHUM Limited in 2007, all three of the Craig Media's A-Channel stations were sold to Rogers Communications and are now owned by Rogers Sports & Media under the Citytv banner, while the former NewNet stations along with most of CHUM Limited's former assets were sold to CTVglobemedia in 2007 which was subsequently sold to Bell Canada in 2011 and are now owned by Bell Media branded as CTV 2.

Programming

A significant amount of the old A-Channel system's programming was subcontracted from CHUM, which did not have stations in the same markets. For several years before CHUM's acquisition of Craig Media, business analysts were already suggesting that some kind of merger between the two companies was likely because of their already-established business relationship. The purchase of CHUM programming was diminished significantly following CKXT's launch but increased following CHUM's purchase in the months before integration into Citytv.

Original programming on the old A-Channel stations included the police reality series To Serve and Protect, the drama 1-800-Missing and the variety series Pepsi Breakout and MTV Select.

Stations
 Calgary/Lethbridge - CKAL
 Edmonton/Red Deer - CKEM 
 Portage la Prairie/Winnipeg - CHMI

CKXT in Toronto, then known as "Toronto 1", carried most of the system's non-CHUM programming from 2003 to 2005. Its logo was also similar to the A-Channel logo, although with a numeral 1 in the square instead of a letter A.

Slogans
"Very Independent, Very (city name)!" (1997-2000)
"More" (2000-2003)
"Connected To You" (2003-2005)

References

1997 establishments in Canada
2005 disestablishments in Canada
Canadian television systems
Television channels and stations established in 1997
Television channels and stations disestablished in 2005